George Edward Kingsley Bemand (19 March 1892 – 26 December 1916) was one of a small number of officers in the British Army of partial African descent to serve in World War I.  He was killed in action in France.

George was born in Jamaica in 1892 to George Bemand Sr. and his wife Minnie.  The family moved to London in 1908 on the RMS Lusitania, with the passenger list in New York recording Minnie and her sons as African.  George attended Dulwich College and then in 1913 went to University College, London to study Engineering.  At the start of the Great War he joined the University of London OTC and in 1915 successfully applied for a commission as a Second Lieutenant in the Royal Field Artillery; in his application, he declared himself to be of pure European descent.

He was sent to France in August 1916 (his school records November 1915). He was killed by a shell on Boxing Day 1916 near Béthune, and is buried at Le Touret Military Cemetery.

His brother Harold served in the ranks as a Gunner. Harold died of wounds in 1917.

References 

1892 births
1916 deaths
Royal Field Artillery officers
British military personnel killed in World War I
People educated at Dulwich College
Alumni of University College London
Jamaican military officers
Colony of Jamaica people
British Army personnel of World War I
Officers' Training Corps officers
Migrants from British Jamaica to the United Kingdom